USS Scott refers to several ships of the U.S. Navy: 

  was originally named USS Scott
 , a  named for Rear Admiral Norman Scott.

See also
 

United States Navy ship names